Wollerau railway station is a railway station in the Swiss canton of Schwyz and municipality of Wollerau. The station is located on the Pfäffikon SZ–Arth-Goldau railway line, owned by the Südostbahn. It is served by the Zurich S-Bahn service S40, from Einsiedeln to Rapperswil.

References

External links 
 

Wollerau
Wollerau